The New Zealand cricket team toured Australia from 7 to 20 December 2007. Three ODIs from 14 to 20 December were played. The series also included a Twenty20 match to be played on 11 December and a tour match featuring Cricket Australia Chairman's XI on 7 December.

Squads

Tour match

KFC Twenty20 International

Chappell-Hadlee series

First ODI: 14 December, Adelaide

Australia led the series 1–0

Second ODI: 16 December, Sydney

Australia led the series 1–0

Third ODI: 20 December, Hobart

Australia won the series 2–0

See also
Australian cricket team in 2007–08

References

Chappell-Hadlee Trophy
Chappell-Hadlee Trophy
New Zealand cricket tours of Australia
Chap
2007 in Australian cricket
2007 in New Zealand cricket